Cheerla Vari Kandrika is a very remote village located in Nellore District, Andhra Pradesh, India.

References

Villages in Nellore district